Mend or MEND may refer to:

 to mend, or to repair
 Mend, Iran, a village in Iran
 Mend (album), by De Rosa, 2006
 Muslim Engagement and Development, a British NGO
 Middle East Nonviolence and Democracy, a Palestinian NGO
 Movement for the Emancipation of the Niger Delta, a Nigerian militant group
 2-Succinyl-5-enolpyruvyl-6-hydroxy-3-cyclohexene-1-carboxylic-acid synthase, encoded by menD gene in E. coli
 Meet Each Need with Dignity, a Californian non-profit
 The Mend (group), a British boy band
 The Mend (film), a 2014 American film